Sami Venäläinen (born 14 October 1981) is a Finnish professional ice hockey player who currently plays professionally in Germany for the Fischtown Pinguins.

Career 
Venäläinen is a product of the Tappara youth system and logged his first minutes for the club's men's team in the Liiga, the highest level professional competition in Finland, during the 2000–01 season. In 2008, he left Tappara and embarked on a three-year stint with fellow Liiga side HC TPS. In 2011, he was back at Tappara and spent another two season with the team. From 2013 to 2016, he played for SaiPa.

After 16 years in the Finnish top-tier, Venäläinen took his game abroad and on July 3, 2016 was signed by the Fischtown Pinguins of the German top-flight Deutsche Eishockey Liga (DEL).

Career statistics

Regular season and playoffs

International

References

External links

1981 births
Arizona Coyotes draft picks
Finnish ice hockey right wingers
Living people
HC TPS players
People from Kangasala
SaiPa players
Tappara players
Fischtown Pinguins players
Sportspeople from Pirkanmaa